The 2009 French Open Super Series was a top level badminton competition which was held from October 27, 2009, to November 1, 2009, in Paris, France. It was the tenth BWF Super Series competition on the 2009 BWF Super Series schedule. The total purse for the event was $200,000.

Men's singles

Seeds
 Lin Dan 
 Peter Gade
 Chen Jin
 Taufik Hidayat
 Sony Dwi Kuncoro
 Joachim Persson
 Wong Choong Hann
 Chan Yan Kit

Results

Women's singles

Seeds
 Wang Lin
 Zhou Mi
 Wang Yihan
 Tine Rasmussen
 Pi Hongyan
 Jiang Yanjiao
 Lu Lan
 Saina Nehwal

Results

Men's doubles

Seeds
 Markis Kido / Hendra Setiawan
 Koo Kien Keat / Tan Boon Heong
 Mathias Boe / Carsten Mogensen
 Cai Yun / Fu Haifeng
 Mohd Zakry Abdul Latif / Mohd Fairuzizuan Mohd Tazari
 Lars Paaske / Jonas Rasmussen
 Anthony Clark / Nathan Robertson
 Guo Zhendong / Xu Chen

Results

Women's doubles

Seeds
 Chin Eei Hui / Wong Pei Tty
 Cheng Shu / Zhao Yunlei
 Du Jing / Yu Yang
 Lena Frier Kristiansen / Kamilla Rytter Juhl
 Ma Jin / Wang Xiaoli
 Shendy Puspa Irawati / Meiliana Jauhari
 Pan Pan / Zhang Yawen
 Nitya Krishinda Maheswari / Greysia Polii

Results

Mixed doubles

Seeds
 Zheng Bo / Ma Jin
 Nova Widianto / Liliyana Natsir
 Thomas Laybourn / Kamilla Rytter Juhl
 Joachim Fischer Nielsen / Christinna Pedersen
 He Hanbin / Yu Yang
 Diju Valiyaveetil / Jwala Gutta
 Hendra Aprida Gunawan / Vita Marissa
 Tao Jiaming / Zhang Yawen

Results

References

External links
French Super Series 2009 at tournamentsoftware.com

French Open (badminton)
J
International sports competitions hosted by Paris
French
French Super Series
French Super Series